Hilaira is a genus of  dwarf spiders that was first described by Eugène Louis Simon in 1884.

Species
 it contains twenty-five species, found in Canada, China, Greenland, Ireland, Japan, Mongolia, Nepal, Norway, Poland, Russia, Switzerland, Turkey, United Kingdom, and the United States:
Hilaira asiatica Eskov, 1987 – Russia (Middle Siberia to Far North-East)
Hilaira banini Marusik & Tanasevitch, 2003 – Mongolia
Hilaira canaliculata (Emerton, 1915) – Russia (Far North-East to Kurile Is.), USA, Canada
Hilaira dapaensis Wunderlich, 1983 – Nepal
Hilaira devitata Eskov, 1987 – Russia (Middle Siberia to Far East)
Hilaira excisa (O. Pickard-Cambridge, 1871) (type) – Europe
Hilaira gertschi Holm, 1960 – Russia (north-east Siberia, Wrangel Is.), USA (Alaska)
Hilaira gibbosa Tanasevitch, 1982 – Russia (Europe to Far East), Mongolia, Canada
Hilaira glacialis (Thorell, 1871) – Norway, Russia (Europe to Far East)
Hilaira herniosa (Thorell, 1875) – North America, Switzerland, Turkey, Scandinavia, Russia (Europe to Far East), Mongolia, Japan
Hilaira hyperboreus (Kulczyński, 1908) – Russia (Middle Siberia)
Hilaira incondita (L. Koch, 1879) – Russia (Europe to Far North-East), Canada
Hilaira jamalensis Eskov, 1981 – Russia (Europe to north-eastern Siberia)
Hilaira marusiki Eskov, 1987 – Russia (north-eastern Siberia), Mongolia
Hilaira meridionalis Tanasevitch, 2013 – Russia (South Siberia)
Hilaira minuta Eskov, 1979 – Russia (West Siberia to Far East), Mongolia
Hilaira nivalis Holm, 1937 – Russia (Urals to north-eastern Siberia)
Hilaira nubigena Hull, 1911 – Britain, Poland, Scandinavia, Russia (Europe to Far North-East), USA (Alaska)
Hilaira pelikena Eskov, 1987 – Russia (Far East)
Hilaira pervicax Hull, 1908 – Ireland, Britain, Scandinavia, Russia (Europe to north-eastern Siberia)
Hilaira proletaria (L. Koch, 1879) – Russia (Urals to Far North-East), USA (Alaska)
Hilaira sibirica Eskov, 1987 – Russia (Middle Siberia to Far East), Mongolia, Canada
Hilaira syrojeczkovskii Eskov, 1981 – Russia (Middle Siberia to Far East)
Hilaira tuberculifera Sha & Zhu, 1995 – China
Hilaira vexatrix (O. Pickard-Cambridge, 1877) – Russia (north-eastern Siberia, Far North-East), North America, Greenland

See also
 List of Linyphiidae species (A–H)

References

Araneomorphae genera
Linyphiidae
Spiders of Asia
Spiders of North America